Göteborg Landvetter Airport is an international airport serving the Gothenburg (Swedish: Göteborg) region in Sweden. With just over 6.8 million passengers in 2018 it is Sweden's second-largest airport after Stockholm–Arlanda. Landvetter is also an important freight airport. During 2007, 60.1 thousand tonnes of air cargo passed through Landvetter, about 60% of the capacity of Arlanda.

The airport is named after Landvetter locality, which is in Härryda municipality. It is operated by Swedavia, the national airport company. Since the closure of Göteborg City Airport for commercial operations, it's the city's only commercial passenger airport.

History
The airport was opened by King Carl XVI Gustaf on 3 October 1977. Passenger services, previously at Torslanda Airport, west of Gothenburg, were moved to Landvetter in 1977. In 2001, some budget airlines began serving the former military base in Säve, which was renamed from Säve Flygplats to Gothenburg City Airport. That airport was closed down in winter 2014–2015 because of large reconstruction needs, meaning an increase of traffic on Landvetter of almost a million annual passengers. There has been a tendency that international air travel has increased, especially on tourists, while domestic has declined somewhat (mostly business travel).

In 2013 the international terminal was extended significantly with new shops, and in 2014 the domestic and international terminals were joined into a single terminal.

On 14 April 2015 Swedavia announced a 10-year long contract with DHL Express to build a new 7500 m2 large cargo terminal, replacing the old 1700 m2. The construction will begin in spring 2015 and is underway for one year. This was a step included in plans for Airport City. In 2018-2020 the terminal building will be enlarged, with three new air bridges.
There are also plans to build a shortcut on the railway Gothenburg–Borås with a tunnel and a railway station under the airport. Construction start has previously been decided to 2016, later 2020, but is as of 2021 delayed.

There has been criticism on the choice of location of the airport, which is fairly foggy, located 150 meters above sea level and often affected by low clouds. The runway direction also often means fairly strong crosswinds which can cause landings to scare passengers. In 2015 an instrument landing system CATIIIb was installed which allows landing in fairly dense fog if corresponding system is fitted onboard aircraft. Many but not all aircraft have that (as of 2018).

During the COVID-19 pandemic, most flights were cancelled. During April 2020, only the KLM route to Amsterdam was consistently operated daily. The passenger figures were 99.5% lower in April 2020 than in April 2019.

Terminals
Landvetter Airport has traditionally had two terminals, domestic and international, but they have merged into one common terminal. In 2009 all baggage drop was moved to in the international terminal, since all baggage had to be screened with new regulations. In 2014 the two terminals joined into one with all baggage collected at the arrivals hall in the previous international terminal. The transfer area, which has several shops, cafés and a restaurant, is accessible for all passengers since that year.

There are eleven air bridges, at gates 12–17 and 19-23. Gates 10–11, 18A–H and 24A–E transport passengers to the aircraft via an airside bus transfer. Traditionally gates 10–15 used to be limited to domestic flights but nowadays 10–19 cater to all flights within the Schengen Area, which are treated as domestic flights.
Gates 22–24 are located in the international transit area, used for flights outside the Schengen Area, and access is only possible after clearing immigration. Gate 20 and 21 are positionable so that, depending on upcoming flights, reaching them may (signed 20B-21B) or may not (signed 20A-21A) require clearing immigration. The freight terminal uses gate numbers below 10.

The airport has a VIP area, where travellers for a fee can go through a dedicated security check, wait in the VIP lounge and be transported by car to the aircraft, avoiding mix with non VIP paying passengers. The VIP area can also hold wedding ceremonies.

Airlines and destinations

Passenger

The following airlines operate regular scheduled and charter flights to and from Göteborg:

Cargo

Statistics

Passenger numbers

Busiest routes

Access

Bus
The airport is served by several shuttle services offered by different private bus companies, such as Flygbussarna, Vy bus4you and Flixbus). Rides between the airport and the Nils Ericson Terminal, located next to the Central train station take about 30 minutes, while rides connecting with the Korsvägen hub are approximately 20 minutes long.

Västtrafik, Gothenburg's public transport agency, also operates the bus line 612 between the airport and the Landvetter village bus station, where further connections to both Gothenburg and Borås can be made.

Flixbus and bus4you also offer the shuttle services, albeit less frequently, between Borås and Jönköping central stations, about 40 and 1h45m away, respectively.

Road
There are 7,300 parking spaces at the airport.

See also
 Civil Aviation Administration (Sweden)
 List of the busiest airports in the Nordic countries
 Västtrafik

References

External links

 
 

Airports in Sweden
Transport in Gothenburg
Buildings and structures in Västra Götaland County
1977 establishments in Sweden
Airports established in 1977
International airports in Sweden